Amblyanthus is a small genus of flowering plants in the family Primulaceae, native to Bangladesh, Assam, and the eastern Himalayas. It is a poorly studied genus, closely related to Ardisia and Amblyanthopsis.

Species
The following species are accepted:
Amblyanthus glandulosus 
Amblyanthus multiflorus 
Amblyanthus obovatus 
Amblyanthus praetervisus

References

Primulaceae
Primulaceae genera
Flora of Bangladesh
Flora of Assam (region)
Flora of East Himalaya